Moondreams is an album from Dick Haymes, released in 1957, arranged & conducted by Ian Bernard. Concert master of the sessions was Felix Slatkin.

Track listing
"If I Should Lose You"  (Leo Robin, Ralph Rainger)    
"You Don't Know What Love Is"  (Don Raye, Gene De Paul)
"Imagination"  (Jimmy Van Heusen, Johnny Burke)  
"Skylark"  (Hoagy Carmichael, Johnny Mercer)  
"Isn't This a Lovely Day?"  (Irving Berlin)  
"What's New?"  (Bob Haggart, Johnny Burke)   
"The Way You Look Tonight"  (Dorothy Fields, Jerome Kern) 
"Then I'll Be Tired of You"  (Yip Harburg, Arthur Schwartz) 
"I Like the Likes of You"  (Vernon Duke, E. Y. Harburg)     
"Moonlight Becomes You"  (Jimmy Van Heusen, Johnny Burke)  
"Between the Devil and the Deep Blue Sea"  (Harold Arlen, Ted Koehler)  
"When I Fall In Love" (Edward Heyman, Victor P. Young)

Recording musicians

Dick Haymes (vocals)
Murray McEachern (trombone) on the small combo sessions|
Abe Most (clarinet) on the small combo sessions
Ian Bernard (piano) on the small combo sessions
Al Hendrickson (guitar) on the small combo sessions
Joe Comfort (bass) on the small combo sessions
Sid Bulkin (drums) on the small combo sessions
Alvin Stoller (drums) on the large orchestral sessions
Jimmy Rowles (piano) in the large orchestra

Sources 
The booklet of the CD collection: The Complete Capitol Collection, written by Ruth Prigozy and Ken Barnes.

Dick Haymes albums
1957 albums
Capitol Records albums